The 2001 German motorcycle Grand Prix was the ninth round of the 2001 Grand Prix motorcycle racing season. It took place on the weekend of 20–22 July 2001 at the Sachsenring.

500 cc classification

250 cc classification

125 cc classification

Championship standings after the race (500cc)

Below are the standings for the top five riders and constructors after round nine has concluded.

Riders' Championship standings

Constructors' Championship standings

 Note: Only the top five positions are included for both sets of standings.

References

German motorcycle Grand Prix
German
Motorcycle Grand Prix